The 2022 Generali Open Kitzbühel was a tennis tournament played on outdoor clay courts. It was the 78th edition of the Austrian Open Kitzbühel, and part of the World Tour 250 series of the 2022 ATP Tour. It took place at the Tennis stadium Kitzbühel in Kitzbühel, Austria, from 25 through 31 July 2022.

Champions

Singles

  Roberto Bautista Agut def.  Filip Misolic, 6–2, 6–2

Doubles

   Pedro Martínez /  Lorenzo Sonego def.  Tim Pütz /  Michael Venus, 5–7, 6–4, [10–8]

Points and prize money

Point distribution

Prize money 

*per team

Singles main draw entrants

Seeds 

 1 Rankings are as of 18 July 2022.

Other entrants
The following players received wildcards into the main draw:
  Nicolás Jarry
  Filip Misolic 
  Jurij Rodionov

The following player received entry with a protected ranking:
  Dominic Thiem

The following players received entry from the qualifying draw:
  Hernán Casanova 
  Vít Kopřiva 
  Gerald Melzer 
  Sebastian Ofner

The following players received entry as lucky losers:
  Daniel Dutra da Silva
  Ivan Gakhov
  Vitaliy Sachko
  Alexander Shevchenko

Withdrawals
  Matteo Berrettini → replaced by  Alexander Shevchenko
  Alejandro Davidovich Fokina → replaced by  Juan Pablo Varillas
  Márton Fucsovics → replaced by  Daniel Dutra da Silva
  Tallon Griekspoor → replaced by  Ivan Gakhov
  Gaël Monfils → replaced by  Jiří Lehečka
  Oscar Otte → replaced by  Carlos Taberner
  Arthur Rinderknech → replaced by  Thiago Monteiro
  Casper Ruud → replaced by  Vitaliy Sachko

Doubles main draw entrants

Seeds 

 1 Rankings as of 18 July 2022.

Other entrants 
The following pairs received wildcards into the doubles main draw:
  Lukas Neumayer /  Sebastian Ofner 
  Neil Oberleitner /  Jurij Rodionov

The following pair received entry as alternates:
  Jonathan Erlich /  João Sousa

Withdrawals
  Rohan Bopanna /  Matwé Middelkoop → replaced by  Jonathan Erlich /  João Sousa
  Nikola Ćaćić /  Dušan Lajović → replaced by  Nikola Ćaćić /  Treat Huey
  Marcel Granollers /  Pedro Martínez → replaced by  Pedro Martínez /  Lorenzo Sonego

References

External links
Official website

Generali Open Kitzbuhel
Austrian Open Kitzbühel
Austrian Open
Generali Open Kitzbühel